The Cape Haze Pioneer Trail is an  rail trail in Charlotte County, Florida on the Cape Haze peninsula running from western Port Charlotte to Placida. A vast majority of the trail runs along the right of way of the former Charlotte Harbor and Northern Railway.

Route description

The trail begins at the intersection of State Road 776 and Pinedale Drive in western Port Charlotte. It runs south along Pinedale Drive briefly before shifting east on to the former railroad corridor. It then proceeds south along the railroad corridor, passing near Rotonda West and crossing over Coral Creek near Coral Creek Airport. At the Coral Creek Country Club, the trail leaves the railroad corridor and runs alongside County Road 771 to Placida, terminating just north of the Boca Grande Causeway.

From here, bicyclists can continue across the causeway to Gasparilla Island and the Boca Grande Bike Path (which runs along the island portion of the railroad corridor).

History

The Charlotte Harbor and Northern Railway, which served Gasparilla Island, existed from 1907 until 1981. Charlotte County gained ownership of the right of way in 1985, and the first portion of the trail was built in 1999 from the Mercer trailhead to Rotonda Boulevard. It was extended over Coral Creek to the Coral Creek Golf Club in 2005. The southernmost portion along County Road 771 from Coral Creek Country Club to Placida was completed in 2010.

Originally, the trail was planned to continue along the railroad corridor all the way to Placida before the Coral Creek Country Club was built, which used up a portion of the corridor. The remaining portion was built along County Road 771. A new bridge carrying CR 771 over Coral Creek was built to accommodate bicycle and pedestrian traffic as part of the trail extension in 2010.

See also
Wildflower Preserve

References

External links

Cape Haze Pioneer Trail Park (Official Web Page)
TrailLink profile for Cape Haze Pioneer Trail
 Cape Haze Pioneer Trail at 100 Florida Trails

Hiking trails in Florida
Rail trails in Florida
Bike paths in Florida
1999 establishments in Florida